Kazuko Sawamatsu (born 5 January 1951) is a retired tennis player from Japan.

She competed in a number of major LTA tournaments in the 1970s on the world circuit. At the 1975 Australian Open, she reached the quarterfinals as well as reached the quarterfinals of the French Open and U.S. Open the same year. She also reached the semifinals of the Australian Open in 1973, and won the 1975 Wimbledon ladies doubles title with partner Ann Kiyomura.

In November 1975, she won the singles title at the Japan Open Tennis Championships, defeating Kiyomura in the final in three sets, and together they won the doubles title.

Sawamatsu is the sister of tennis player Junko Sawamatsu and the aunt of Naoko Sawamatsu.

Grand Slam finals

Doubles (1 title)

References

External links
 
 
 

French Open champions
Japanese female tennis players
People from Nishinomiya
Sportspeople from Hyōgo Prefecture
Wimbledon champions
Living people
1951 births
Wimbledon junior champions
Grand Slam (tennis) champions in women's doubles
Grand Slam (tennis) champions in girls' singles
Universiade medalists in tennis
Universiade silver medalists for Japan
Medalists at the 1970 Summer Universiade
20th-century Japanese women
21st-century Japanese women